Even Northug (born 26 September 1995) is a Norwegian cross-country skier.

He competed at the 2014 World Junior Championships, finishing ninth in the sprint race. In the U23 class he competed at the 2016 and 2018 World Junior Championships, claiming the sprint bronze medal in 2018.

He made his World Cup debut in March 2015 in Drammen, a sprint race. Competing in nothing but sprint, he collected his first World Cup points a year later in Drammen with an eighth place. Following another eighth place in December 2017 in Lillehammer, he improved to a sixth place in January 2018 in Dresden.

He represents the sports clubs Mosvik IL and Strindheim IL. He is a younger brother of Petter Northug and Tomas Northug.

Cross-country skiing results
All results are sourced from the International Ski Federation (FIS).

World Championships

World Cup

Season standings

Individual podiums
 2 podiums – (2 )

Team podiums
 1 victory – (1 ) 
 1 podium – (1 )

References 

1995 births
Living people
People from Mosvik
Norwegian male cross-country skiers
Sportspeople from Trøndelag